On the morning of 9 August 2017, a car rammed into a group of soldiers in the Levallois-Perret commune in the northwestern suburbs of Paris. Six soldiers patrolling the area as part of Opération Sentinelle were injured in the attack, three of them seriously. The driver fled the scene and, several hours later, was shot and arrested by an elite police unit on a highway near the town of Marquise, Pas-de-Calais after attempting to ram a roadblock. According to the French police the incident was terrorist-related.

On 23 August 2017 French prosecutors pressed terrorism charges against the suspect, 36-year-old Algerian Hamou Benlatrèche, who was said to have "radical beliefs and showed interest in the Islamic State group."

Context
The attack is part of a series of terrorist attacks in France since November 2015, about half of which have targeted police of the military patrols that appeared in the streets of France with the imposition of the state of emergency that has been in continuous effect since the November 2015 Paris attacks. The site of the attack, Levallois-Perret is home to the headquarters of France's main intelligence agency, the General Directorate for Internal Security (DCRI), and also the staging point for soldiers assigned to protect sensitive sites in the French capital.

Attack 
On the morning of 9 August 2017 at around 07:45, a car that had been "visibly pre-positioned" rammed into a group of a dozen soldiers as they left their barracks in Place de Verdun in the morning. The driver behind the wheel of a dark-colored BMW, was waiting in "ambush" in an alley from which he could see the soldiers emerge and begin to walk towards their patrol vehicles to start their morning's work. The group, members of the 35th Infantry Regiment stationed in Belfort who were taking part in Opération Sentinelle.  According to Interior Minister Gérard Collomb, the car approached slowly, then sped up to deliberately target the soldiers.  At least six were injured, three of them seriously, of which one was unconscious. The car then fled the scene while the remaining soldiers tried to give chase. The attack was described as 'deliberate' by French police as the car was waiting for the soldiers to arrive at the spot the driver intended to attack.

The U.S. Embassy in Paris warned Americans to avoid the Levallois-Perret area following the attack.

Four of the victims were transported to the Bégin Military Teaching Hospital in Saint-Mandé and the two more severely wounded soldiers were transported to the Hôpital d'instruction des armées Percy in Clamart. French Interior Minister Gérard Collomb and Defense Minister Florence Parly both visited injured soldiers at the Bégin Military Teaching Hospital later the same day.

Capture and arrests
A large police operation of several hundred agents was deployed to capture the suspect. Government spokesman Christophe Castaner said that "all means are mobilized to neutralize the person or persons who are responsible," and that President Emmanuel Macron had discussed the attack at a security meeting and at a cabinet meeting. Several hours after the attack, at around 13:30, the Rouen and Lille elite police unit Research and Intervention Brigade cornered and stopped the vehicle, a BMW 2 Series Active Tourer branded rental car, near a petrol station on a motorway in Marquise, Pas-de-Calais after being spotted in Leulinghen-Bernes some 260 kilometers (162 miles) north of the capital on the A16 autoroute.

The driver who attempted to force the roadblock received five gunshot wounds and was sent to a hospital in serious condition, as was a policeman who was also injured by a stray bullet fired by one of his colleagues. After being stopped in his car and ignoring several calls by police, he reached his hand as if attempting to grab a weapon, causing police to fire at the suspect. A testimonial, a report from a police officer, as well as a tracker that had been installed by the company to the person who rented the vehicle, for which the suspect worked as a driver, made it possible to locate the vehicle. The police officer reporting the vehicle had recorded its license number after driving on the highway north of Paris and noticing "a car passing at full speed with its windshield, hood and front bumper damaged."

French Prime Minister Édouard Philippe confirmed that the man arrested was the same who committed the attack.

Later the same day, investigators raided several addresses in Île-de-France associated with the suspect. A second man, a relative of the first, was arrested and held for questioning in Marseilles.

Suspect and investigation
The suspect is a 36-year-old Algerian national Hamou Benlatrèche living in the Paris suburb of Bezons. He had no previous convictions by a French court, but was known to police since 2013 for committing an offense of assisting illegal immigrants. A member of the Tablighi Jamaat movement, he was described by his uncle as "a faithful Muslim who prayed regularly" and frequented a mosque near his home in Val-d'Oise, but was not known to have been radicalised. He was not registered among the several thousand Islamic extremists and potential threats to national security monitored by French intelligence.

Benlatrèche was held in a hospital in Lille and was not expected to recover sufficiently to be questioned for several weeks.

Interior Minister Gérard Collomb visited the scene of the attack late in the afternoon, and confirmed that a terrorist investigation has been launched. He said the attack after how it happened was "clearly a deliberate act." Patrick Balkany, mayor of Levallois-Perret described the attack as "without doubt a deliberate act" and "an odious aggression against our military."

On 23 August 2017, the French anti-terrorism prosecutor Francois Molins pressed charges of "attempted murder of security forces in connection with a terrorist enterprise" against Benlatrèche, saying that he "had radical beliefs and showed interest in the Islamic State group." He had also reportedly shown interest in traveling to Syria.

See also
Sept-Sorts car attack, a few days later

References

External links
 The Latest: French police search building after car attack, news timeline by Associated Press
 Paris Attack: Man Held After Car Ploughs Into Soldier, photo series by Getty Images

2017 road incidents in Europe
21st century in Île-de-France
August 2017 crimes in Europe
August 2017 events in France
Crime in Île-de-France
History of Hauts-de-Seine
Islamic terrorism in Paris
Opération Sentinelle
Terrorist incidents in France in 2017
Vehicular rampage in France
Islamic terrorist incidents in 2017